Jivarus is a genus of spur-throated grasshoppers in the family Acrididae. There are more than 20 described species in Jivarus, found in Ecuador, Colombia, and Peru.

Species
These 29 species belong to the genus Jivarus:
 Jivarus alienus (Walker, 1870)  (Colombia and Ecuador)
 Jivarus alticola Ronderos, 1981  (Colombia)
 Jivarus americanus Giglio-Tos, 1898  (Ecuador)
 Jivarus antisanae (Bolívar, 1881)  (Ecuador)
 Jivarus auriculus Cigliano & Amédégnato, 2010  (Ecuador)
 Jivarus brunneus Ronderos, 1981  (Colombia)
 Jivarus carbonelli Ronderos, 1979  (Colombia and Ecuador)
 Jivarus cohni Ronderos, 1979  (Ecuador)
 Jivarus discoloris Cigliano & Amédégnato, 2010  (Peru)
 Jivarus ecuadoricus (Hebard, 1924)  (Ecuador)
 Jivarus eumera (Hebard, 1923)  (Colombia)
 Jivarus guarandaensis Cigliano & Amédégnato, 2010  (Ecuador)
 Jivarus gurneyi Ronderos, 1979  (Ecuador)
 Jivarus hubbelli Ronderos, 1979  (Ecuador)
 Jivarus jagoi Ronderos, 1979  (Ecuador)
 Jivarus laevis Ronderos, 1979  (Ecuador)
 Jivarus marginalis Ronderos, 1979  (Colombia)
 Jivarus megacercus Cigliano & Amédégnato, 2010  (Ecuador)
 Jivarus ochraceus Ronderos, 1981 (Inga Grasshopper)  (Colombia)
 Jivarus pictifrons Ronderos, 1979 (Jimbura Mountain Grasshopper)  (Ecuador and Peru)
 Jivarus profundus Cigliano & Amédégnato, 2010  (Ecuador)
 Jivarus pubescens Ronderos, 1979  (Ecuador)
 Jivarus rectus Cigliano & Amédégnato, 2010  (Ecuador)
 Jivarus rentzi Ronderos, 1979  (Ecuador)
 Jivarus riveti Cigliano & Amédégnato, 2010  (Ecuador)
 Jivarus ronderosi Cigliano & Amédégnato, 2010  (Ecuador)
 Jivarus spatulus Cigliano & Amédégnato, 2010  (Ecuador)
 Jivarus sphaericus Cigliano & Amédégnato, 2010  (Ecuador)
 Jivarus viridis Ronderos, 1979  (Ecuador)

References

External links

 

Acrididae